Moulay Rachid may refer to:

Prince Moulay Rachid ben al Hassan of Morocco
Moulay Rachid (district), Casablanca
Moulay Rachid (arrondissement), Casablanca
Moulay Rachid, or Rashid ibn Ali al-Sharif, the founder of the Alaouite dynasty of Morocco.